A results-only work environment (ROWE) is a work approach in which employees are entirely autonomous and responsible for delivering outcomes. Work is defined as an activity that employees carry out, rather than a physical location they visit. This managerial tactic redirects attention from the hours spent at work to the results generated. Leaders mentor performance and oversee the work itself, instead of micromanaging employees' time.

Origins 
In 2003, Best Buy headquarters in Minneapolis, Minnesota initiated an innovation experiment called ROWE. Two employees, Jody Thompson and Cali Ressler, questioned the effectiveness of their work approach in generating optimal outcomes for both the company and its employees. They aimed to establish an atmosphere that would facilitate employee flourishing and enable the company to attain its desired results.

Researchers refer to this as a dual agenda.

Essential Elements 
A results-only work environment provides employees with complete autonomy over the timing, location, and methodology of their work. Instead of being bound to a specific workplace or schedule, personnel are responsible for achieving desired outcomes, such as meeting sales objectives, satisfying customers, or increasing productivity.

A genuine results-only work environment (ROWE) is a modern work culture that rests on the principle that individuals are recruited to produce clear, measurable results. Managers focus on managing the work being accomplished rather than where and when people work.

Employees in a results-only work environment enjoy autonomy, meaning they have complete authority over their time and can decide when and where to carry out their tasks. They also assume accountability for their professions, jobs, training, and ensuring they have the necessary resources to perform their duties effectively. It is the responsibility of managers to define the work that needs to be done and the specific outcomes that must be attained. Managers and employees collaborate to establish realistic deadlines for completing the work. Each person has a clear understanding of the measurable results they need to produce. Everyone within the organization is accountable for collaborating to accomplish the desired outcomes.

Claimed Advantages

Productivity, Revenue, Growth, Attracting and Retaining Talent, Employee Engagement, Efficiency 
Certified ROWE organizations (for example, Mabel’s Labels) report higher productivity, increased revenue, reduced turnover, more successful recruitment and better engagement from staff.  After achieving ROWE certification, JL Buchanan reported increases in employee engagement, productivity and efficiency, profits, and top line sales.  Early adopters of the ROWE system at Canada Mortgage and Housing Corporation (CMHC) showed consistently higher employee engagement scores compared to their co-workers as measured by quarterly pulse surveys.  Certification as a ROWE attracts and retains talented employees.  At CMHC, ROWE is the number one reason new employees choose to work there.

Health Benefits 
ROWE employees are healthier, feel less stress and anxiety, and sleep better.

ROWE reduces the risk of serious health problems.  Biomarker data (blood pressure, body mass index, a pre-diabetes marker evident in blood, and more) was collected to create a cardio-metabolic risk score to predict the likelihood of a cardiovascular event.  Employees who had higher risk scores at baseline reduced their risk of having a heart attack, stroke or other cardiovascular event by working in a ROWE when compared to a control group of employees not working in a ROWE.

ROWE reduces stress.  Researchers collected saliva samples to measure cortisol levels over a period of time before and after a ROWE implementation and found the ROWE work redesign had a positive physiological effect on employees.

Why is reducing stress important? According to the American Institute of Stress, job stress costs United States employers $300 billion annually.

Loyalty 
ROWE employees are more loyal to their companies.

Voluntary turnover decreases.

Employees working in a ROWE are more likely to stay with the company.

According to a Harvard Business School Case Study of a large organization, employees stated they could not imagine returning to the old way of working and that the freedom they have in a ROWE is priceless.

Diversity, Equity & Inclusion (DEI) 
McKinsey & Company recognized the results-only work environment as an example of diversity enabling infrastructure. CMHC (mentioned above) uses all of the data it collects to inform its D&I strategy and create targeted interventions to address pain points. CMHC’s transition to a Results-Only Work Environment is a holistic example of this.

Reduces work to non-work conflict 
Research studies reveal that employees and managers figure out ways to work smarter resulting in:  parents spending more time with their children and elders who require care; adolescent children faring better in terms of mood and sleep; and employees getting extra sleep, finding time to exercise and volunteer in their communities.  Working in a ROWE also assists employees dealing with family crises.

Return on Investment (ROI) 
The estimated return on investing in ROWE is 1.68 meaning for every dollar invested, the company saves $1.68.  (this number includes: reduced absenteeism, reduced presenteeism, lower medical costs, and reduced voluntary turnover).

Real Estate Costs 
ROWE certified companies tend to reduce real estate costs by decreasing dedicated work spaces for all employees.

Improved Environmental Outcomes 
According to eWorkplace, a study conducted in the Twin Cities metro area, no longer requiring employees to drive to and from the office during rush hour traffic, reduces carbon emissions as well as wear and tear on roads, thus reducing costs associated with maintaining roads. A Canadian government agency reported reduced gas emissions of 5.3 million kilometers, the equivalent of reducing carbon emission by 1,300 metric tons per year.

No Post-Pandemic Employee Rebellion 
Watt Publishing closed their offices during the pandemic in 2020.  Once public health conditions allowed them to re-open their office building, they did, with relevant rules on mask-wearing and social distancing. Employees continued to choose when and where to work, at the office or elsewhere.  CEO Greg Watt did not change any policies, or create complex re-entry plans. Watt reported that the company did not experience any kind of employee rebellion from unhappy employees.

Future of Work 
Daniel Pink called ROWE the future of work.  In his book, Drive, Daniel Pink recognizes Jody Thompson as one of the six business leaders who offer wise guidance for designing organizations that promote autonomy, mastery, and purpose, the key elements for motivating performance and who have created a bold path forward for the future of work.

Criticism 
Less than a year into his job, in which he was tasked with turning around a company considered on the brink of bankruptcy, former CEO Hubert Joly said Best Buy’s program had given employees too much independence.

A government organization reported that employees spend less time socializing with coworkers at the office.

References

Human resource management